The 2011 Manitoba general election was held to elect Members of the Legislative Assembly of Manitoba. It took place on October 4, 2011, due to the new fixed-date election laws. In the outgoing legislature, the New Democratic Party of Manitoba (NDP) held 37 of the 57 seats, the Progressive Conservative Party of Manitoba (PC Party) held 19 of the 57 seats and the Liberal Party of Manitoba held one of the 57 seats, after Kevin Lamoureux resigned his seat in the riding of Inkster to run as a Liberal candidate in a federal by-election.

Following the last census, electoral district boundaries were adjusted. There are 57 electoral districts.

Despite being perceived as a tight race in the run-up to voting, with The Globe and Mail expecting it to be the "closest in more than a decade", the NDP won its fourth consecutive term in government, taking 37 seats, an improvement of one from the 2007 election – thus gaining their largest majority ever in the Assembly – whilst the Progressive Conservatives failed to make any gains beyond closing the gap in the popular vote, and not a single incumbent was defeated. The PC leader Hugh McFadyen announced shortly thereafter that he would resign his post. Also facing a disappointing result in the election, Liberal leader Jon Gerrard also announced shortly after the election that he would resign his post once the party crowned a new leader in 2013.

Party leadership

The Green Party and the NDP have chosen new leaders since the last general election.

On August 27, 2009 Premier Gary Doer, after being Premier of Manitoba for ten years announced his resignation as Premier and leader of the NDP. The following day he was appointed Canada's Ambassador to the United States.

Three candidates entered the campaign to replace Doer: Steve Ashton, Greg Selinger and Andrew Swan. On September 28, 2009, Swan bowed out of the race and endorsed Selinger. Some pundits believe this was an attempt to stop Steve Ashton from becoming leader.

Ashton, first seen as a minor candidate, ended up being a heavy-weight and, gaining momentum, scored big victories in some ridings, however it wasn't enough to convince many MLAs or win union endorsement. Selinger won the leadership election on October 17, 2009 with 65.75% of the ballot. His victory was achieved in large part by being backed by unions and the vast majority of the party elite.

The Green Party elected James Beddome to a two-year term party leader on November 15, 2008, defeating incumbent Andrew Basham and third candidate Shane Nestruck. After his victory, he said that he would work toward running a full slate of candidates in the next provincial election. He was the party's candidate for a by-election in the northeast Winnipeg division of Elmwood in early 2009.

Election summary

|- style="background:#ccc;"
! rowspan="2" colspan="2" style="text-align:left;"|Party
! rowspan="2" style="text-align:left;"|Party leader

!rowspan="2"|Candidates
! colspan="4" style="text-align:center;"|Seats
! colspan="3" style="text-align:center;"|Popular vote
|- style="background:#ccc;"
| style="text-align:center;"|2007
| style="text-align:center;"|Dissol.
| style="text-align:center;"|2011
| style="text-align:center;"|% Change
| style="text-align:center;"|#
| style="text-align:center;"|%
| style="text-align:center;"|% Change

|align=left|New Democratic
|align=left|Greg Selinger
|align="right"|57
|align="right"|36
|align="right"|36
|align="right"|37
|align="right"|+2.78%
|align="right"|199,069
|align="right"|46.16
|align="right"|−1.84

|align=left|Progressive Conservative
|align=left|Hugh McFadyen
|align="right"|57
|align="right"|19
|align="right"|18
|align="right"|19
|align="right"|0.00%
|align="right"|188,535
|align="right"|43.71
|align="right"|+5.97

|align=left|Liberal
|align=left|Jon Gerrard
|align="right"|57
|align="right"|2
|align="right"|1
|align="right"|1
|align="right"|−50.00%
|align="right"|32,418
|align="right"|7.52
|align="right"|−4.60

|align=left|James Beddome
|align="right"|32
|align="right"|0
|align="right"|0
|align="right"|0
|align="right"|−
|align="right"|10,886
|align="right"|2.52
|align="right"|+1.18

|align=left|Darrell Rankin
|align="right"|4
|align="right"|0
|align="right"|0
|align="right"|0
|align="right"|−
|align="right"|179
|align="right"|0.04
|align="right"|-0.05

| colspan="2" style="text-align:left;"|Independent
|align="right"|1
|align="right"|0
|align="right"|0
|align="right"|0
|align="right"|−
|align="right"|215
|align="right"|0.05
|align="right"|-0.25

| style="text-align:left;" colspan="4"|Vacant
|align="right"|2
| style="text-align:right;" colspan="5"|
|-
| style="text-align:left;" colspan="3"|Total Valid Votes
| style="text-align:right;"|208
| style="text-align:right;"|57
| style="text-align:right;"|57
| style="text-align:right;"|57
| style="text-align:right;"|−
| style="text-align:right;"|431,302
| style="text-align:right;"|55.77%
| style="text-align:right;"|-0.98%
|}

Turnout
Of 777,054 registered voters, 55.77% or 433,346 cast votes in the election. Although this is slightly lower than the 2007 election, voter turnout in Manitoba has generally declined since the mid-1970s when it reached 78.3% in the 1973 general election. About 78,500 voters took advantage of advance polls, more than any previous election.

Marginal seats
The following is a list of the ten ridings most narrowly lost by the indicated party in the 2007 election (by percentage of the vote the indicated party lost by).

New boundaries are in effect for the 2011 election, so some ridings not listed may come into place in the next election with population movements.

Incumbents not contesting their seats

Retiring incumbents

Election campaign

Issues

Bipole III
Manitoba Hydro planned an alternative hydro-electric transmission line to Bipole I and II routes running through the Interlake region in Manitoba. Initially it planned a more easterly route to the east of Lake Winnipeg. The NDP ignored the expert opinion of Manitoba Hydro and decided to build the line on the west side of the province at a cost of $4.1 billion. Further, the NDP proposed the creation of a large UNESCO environmental heritage site named Pimachiowin Aki. Just days before his retirement as premier, Doer announced that the government would donate $10 million to the trust fund for UNESCO World Heritage site on the east side of Lake Winnipeg. The NDP claimed that an east side Bipole III route would jeopardise the UNESCO site and claimed that a heritage site would benefit First Nations communities more. The NDP proposed a longer, more expensive, alternative route through the west of Manitoba to preserve the environmental integrity of the east side. Subject to the Environmental Impact Statement to be completed in June 2011, the construction of the line will begin in the winter of 2012, one year after the election.

Progressive Conservative leader Hugh McFadyen opposes the western route stating that it would cost $1 billion to $1.75 billion more, it would destroy more trees, 15 out of 16 First Nations believed the Bipole III would be more economically beneficial, and would be more at risk from disasters as the Bipole lines in the Interlake. McFadyen promised that if elected he would cancel the western route, and build it down the east side. McFadyen also supported the UNESCO site on the east side and claims that Bipole III would not jeopardise the World Heritage Site.

Liberal leader Jon Gerrard proposed that instead of building the line down the east or west, Manitoba Hydro should put the cable under Lake Winnipeg as proposed by Dr. John Ryan, retired University of Winnipeg professor in 2008. In the fall of 2010 Gerrard asked Manitoba Hydro CEO Bob Brennan if he had inquired into the Lake Winnipeg route. Brennan said that he had not. Gerrard promised to build the line through Lake Winnipeg if elected.

Opinion polls

Leadership approval rating

Candidates by riding
 Note that names in bold type represent Cabinet members, while italics represent party leaders.

Northern Manitoba

|-
| style="background:whitesmoke;"|Flin Flon
||
|Clarence Pettersen1,901 (57.10%)
|
|Darcy Linklater791 (23.76%)
|
|Thomas Heine510 (15.31%)
|
|Saara Harvie110 (3.30%)
|
|
||
|Gerard Jennissen
|-
| style="background:whitesmoke;"|Kewatinook
||
|Eric Robinson2,043 (56.79%)
|
|Michael Birch1,389 (38.61%)
|
|Orville Woodford49 (1.36%)
|
|Philip Green94 (2.61%)
|
|
||
|Eric Robinson
|-
| style="background:whitesmoke;"|Swan River
||
|Ron Kostyshyn4,280 (55.81%)
|
|Dave Powell3,078 (40.14%)
|
|Reynald Cook264 (3.44%)
|
|
|
|
||
|Rosann Wowchuk
|-
| style="background:whitesmoke;"|The Pas
||
|Frank Whitehead2,995 (73.20%)
|
|Alfred McDonald959 (23.44%)
|
|Girma Tessema115 (2.81%)
|
|
|
|
||
|Frank Whitehead
|-
| style="background:whitesmoke;"|Thompson
||
|Steve Ashton2,586 (68.19%)
|
|Anita Campbell1,068 (28.16%)
|
|Ken Dillen120 (3.16%)
|
|
|
|
||
|Steve Ashton
|}

Westman/Parkland

|-
| style="background:whitesmoke;"|Agassiz
|
|Amity Sagness1,058 (17.13%)
||
|Stu Briese 4,390 (71.09%)
|
|Gary Sallows410 (6.64%)
|
|Kate Storey317 (5.13%)
|
|
|
|New District
|-
| style="background:whitesmoke;"|Arthur-Virden
|
|Garry Draper2,274 (30.18%)
||
|Larry Maguire4,975 (66.03%)
|
|Murray Cliff286 (3.80%)
|
|
|
|
||
|Larry Maguire
|-
| style="background:whitesmoke;"|Brandon East
||
|Drew Caldwell3,533 (54.77%)
|
|Mike Waddell2,513 (38.75%)
|
|Shaun Cameron280 (4.23%)
|
|Vanda Fleury158 (2.45%)
|
|
||
|Drew Caldwell
|-
| style="background:whitesmoke;"|Brandon West
|
|Jim Murray4,073 (46.98%)
||
|Reg Helwer4,219 (48.66%)
|
|George Buri378 (4.36%)
|
|
|
|
||
|Rick Borotsik
|-
| style="background:whitesmoke;"|Dauphin
||
|Stan Struthers 4,470 (54.91%)
|
|Lloyd McKinney3,351 (41.17%)
|
|Sisay Tessema123 (1.51%)
|
|Tamela Friesen196 (2.41%)
|
|
|
|New District
|-
| style="background:whitesmoke;"|Riding Mountain
|
|Albert Parsons2,604 (34.26%)
||
|Leanne Rowat 4,461 (58.69%)
|
|Carl Hyde270 (3.55%)
|
|Signe Knutson266 (3.50%)
|
|
|
|New District
|-
| style="background:whitesmoke;"|Spruce Woods
|
|Cory Szczepanski1,923 (28.58%)
||
|Cliff Cullen4,487 (66.69%)
|
|Trenton Zazalak318 (4.73%)
|
|
|
|
|
|New District
|}

Central Manitoba

|-
| style="background:whitesmoke;"|Emerson
|
|Lorie Fiddler1,082 (19.76%)
||
|Cliff Graydon3,983 (72.72%)
|
|Micheline Belliveau412 (7.52%)
|
|
|
|
||
|Cliff Graydon
|-
| style="background:whitesmoke;"|Gimli
||
|Peter Bjornson5,004 (51.79%)
|
|Jeff Wharton4,154 (42.99%)
|
|Lawrence Einarsson195 (2.02%)
|
|Glenda Whiteman309 (3.20%)
|
|
||
|Peter Bjornson
|-
| style="background:whitesmoke;"|Interlake
||
|Tom Nevakshonoff3,359 (50.47%)
|
|Steve Lupky2,899 (43.56%)
|
|Albert Ratt184 (2.76%)
|
|
|
|John Zasitko213 (3.20%)
||
|Tom Nevakshonoff
|-
| style="background:whitesmoke;"|Lakeside
|
|Rosemary Hnatiuk1,956 (25.71%)
||
|Ralph Eichler5,036 (66.20%)
|
|Jerald Funk246 (3.23%)
|
|Betty Kehler369 (4.85%)
|
|
||
|Ralph Eichler
|-
| style="background:whitesmoke;"|Midland
|
|Jacqueline Theroux1,746 (23.64%)
||
|Blaine Pedersen5,133 (69.50%)
|
|Leah Jeffers507 (6.86%)
|
|
|
|
|
|New District
|-
| style="background:whitesmoke;"|Morden-Winkler
|
|Aaron McDowell656 (11.43%)
||
|Cameron Friesen4,912 (85.56%)
|
|Daniel Woldeyohanis173 (3.01%)
|
|
|
|
|
|New District
|-
| style="background:whitesmoke;"|Morris
|
|Mohamed Alli1,480 (19.33%)
||
|Mavis Taillieu5,669 (74.06%)
|
|Janelle Mailhot506 (6.61%)
|
|
|
|
||
|Mavis Taillieu
|-
| style="background:whitesmoke;"|Portage la Prairie
|
|James Kostuchuk2,689 (39.39%)
||
|Ian Wishart3,556 (52.24%)
|
|Michelle Cudmore-Armstrong571 (8.37%)
|
|
|
|
||
|David Faurschou
|}

Eastman

|-
| style="background:whitesmoke;"| Dawson Trail
||
|Ron Lemieux4,284 (52.51%)
|
|Laurent Tetrault3,554 (43.56%)
|
|Sandra Hoskins321 (3.93%)
|
|
|
|
|
|New District
|-
| style="background:whitesmoke;"|Lac du Bonnet
|
|Elana Spence 2,853 (36.74%)
||
|Wayne Ewasko4,266 (54.94%)
|
|Charlett Millen351 (4.52%)
|
|Dan Green295 (3.80%)
|
|
||
|Vacant
|-
| style="background:whitesmoke;"|La Verendrye
|
|Maurice Tallaire1,823 (25.94%)
||
|Dennis Smook4,480 (63.75%)
|
|Monica Guetre372 (5.31%)
|
|Janine Gibson351 (5.00%)
|
|
||
|Ron Lemieux
|-
| style="background:whitesmoke;"|Steinbach
|
|Dally Gutierrez487 (7.62%)
||
|Kelvin Goertzen5,469 (85.52%)
|
|Lee Fehler 439 (6.86%)
|
| 
|
|
||
|Kelvin Goertzen
|-
| style="background:whitesmoke;"| St. Paul
|
|Cynthia Ryan3,479 (37.40%)
||
|Ron Schuler5,547 (59.63%)
|
|Ludolf Grollé276 (2.97%)
|
|
|
|
|
|New District
|-
| style="background:whitesmoke;"|Selkirk
||
|Greg Dewar3,882 (56.35%)
|
|David Bell2,703 (39.24%)
|
|Marilyn Courchene304 (4.41%)
|
|
|
|
||
|Greg Dewar
|}

Northwest Winnipeg

|-
| style="background:whitesmoke;"|Burrows
||
|Melanie Wight3,063 (59.35%)
|
|Rick Negrych 1,314 (25.58%)
|
|Twyla Motkaluk629 (12.18%)
|
|Garett Peepeetch124 (2.29%)
|
|Frank Komarniski (CPC-M)32 (0.61%)
||
|Doug Martindale
|-
| style="background:whitesmoke;"|Kildonan
||
|Dave Chomiak4,808 (59.52%)
|
|Darrell Penner2,880 (35.65%)
|
|Dimitrius Sagriotis391 (4.83%)
|
|
|
|
||
|Dave Chomiak
|-
| style="background:whitesmoke;"|Point Douglas
||
|Kevin Chief3,806 (73.50%)
|
|John Vernaus917 (17.95%)
|
|Mary Lou Bourgeois257 (4.51%)
|
|Teresa Pun176 (3.32%)
|
|Darrell Rankin (CPC-M)38 (0.71%)
||
|George Hickes
|-
| style="background:whitesmoke;"|St. Johns
||
|Gord Mackintosh4,157 (65.93%)
|
|Ray Larkin1,405 (22.40%)
|
|Trevor Mueller348 (5.48%)
|
|Alon Weinberg392 (6.20%)
|
|
||
|Gord Mackintosh
|-
| style="background:whitesmoke;"|The Maples
||
|Mohinder Saran3,894 (51.8%)
|
|Jose Tomas1,943 (25.9%)
|
|Pablito Sarinas1,395 (18.57%)
|
|John Redekopp281 (3.73%)
|
|
||
|Mohinder Saran
|-
| style="background:whitesmoke;"|Tyndall Park
||
|Ted Marcelino2,596 (44.93%)
|
|Cris Aglugub908 (15.79%)
|
|Roldan Sevillano 2,007 (34.94%)
|
|Dean Koshelanyk237 (4.34%)
|
|
|
|New District
|}

Northeast Winnipeg

|-
| style="background:whitesmoke;"|Concordia
||
|Matt Wiebe 4,008 (62.72%)
|
|Naseer Warraich 1,803 (28.21%)
|
|Isaiah Oyeleru 237 (3.70%)
|
|Ryan Poirier 308 (4.82%)
|
|
||
|Matt Wiebe
|-
| style="background:whitesmoke;"|Elmwood
||
|Jim Maloway 3,864 (54.14%)
|
|David Hutten 2,399 (33.61%)
|
|Anthony Dratowany 467 (6.54%)
|
|Ray Eskritt 346 (4.84%)
|
|
||
|Bill Blaikie
|-
| style="background:whitesmoke;"|Radisson
||
|Bidhu Jha 5,033 (54.94%)
|
|Desmond Penner 3,588 (39.17%)
|
|Shirley Robert 506 (5.52%)
|
|
|
|
||
|Bidhu Jha
|-
| style="background:whitesmoke;"|River East
|
|Kurt Penner4,512 (43.92%)
||
|Bonnie Mitchelson5,247 (51.07%)
|
|Christopher Pelda188 (1.83%)
|
|Kelly Mitchell274 (2.66%)
|
|
||
|Bonnie Mitchelson
|-
| style="background:whitesmoke;"|Rossmere
||
|Erna Braun 5,392 (56.37%)
|
|Kaur Sidhu 3,430 (35.86%)
|
|Rene Belliveau356 (3.72%)
|
|Evan Maydaniuk351 (3.67%)
|
|
||
|Erna Braun
|-
| style="background:whitesmoke;"|St. Boniface
||
|Greg Selinger5,914 (68.56%)
|
|Frank Clark1,537 (17.82%)
|
|Brad Gross606 (7.02%)
|
|Alain Landry530 (6.14%)
|
|
||
|Greg Selinger
|-
| style="background:whitesmoke;"|Transcona
||
|Daryl Reid4,488 (57.92%)
|
|Craig Stapon2,668 (34.43%)
|
|Faye McLeod-Jashyn551 (7.11%)
|
|
|
|
||
|Daryl Reid
|}

West Winnipeg

|-
| style="background:whitesmoke;"|Assiniboia
||
|Jim Rondeau5,093 (58.22%)
|
|Susan Auch3,258 (37.24%)
|
|Moe Bokhari194 (2.22%)
|
|Anlina Sheng203 (2.32%)
|
|
||
|Jim Rondeau
|-
| style="background:whitesmoke;"|Charleswood
|
|Paul Beckta2,597 (30.05%)
||
|Myrna Driedger4,826 (55.84%)
|
|Matthew Ostrove751 (8.69%)
|
|Dirk Hoeppner469 (5.83%)
|
|
||
|Myrna Driedger
|-
| style="background:whitesmoke;"|Kirkfield Park
||
|Sharon Blady4,900 (46.80%)
|
|Kelly de Groot4,871 (46.52%)
|
|Syed Bokhari363 (3.47%)
|
|Alanna Gray337 (3.22%)
|
|
||
|Sharon Blady
|-
| style="background:whitesmoke;"|St. James
||
|Deanne Crothers4,411 (49.75%)
|
|Scott Gillingham3,403 (38.38%)
|
|Gerard Allard679 (7.66%)
|
|Trevor Vandale374 (4.22%)
|
|
||
|Bonnie Korzeniowski
|-
| style="background:whitesmoke;"|Tuxedo
|
|Dashi Zargani2,319 (25.35%)
||
|Heather Stefanson4,829 (52.79%)
|
|Linda Minuk1,509 (16.5%)
|
|Donald Benham491 (5.36%)
|
|
||
|Heather Stefanson
|}

Central Winnipeg

|-
| style="background:whitesmoke;"|Fort Garry-Riverview
||
|James Allum5,137 (55.52%)
|
|Ian Rabb3,054 (33.01%)
|
|Kevin Freedman663 (7.17%)
|
|Daniel Backé398 (4.30%)
|
|
|
|New District
|-
| style="background:whitesmoke;"|Fort Rouge
||
|Jennifer Howard4,493 (51.27%)
|
|Sonny Dominique1,767 (20.16%)
|
|Paul Hesse2,026 (23.12%)
|
|Stephen Weedon477 (5.44%)
|
|
||
|Jennifer Howard
|-
| style="background:whitesmoke;"|Logan
||
|Flor Marcelino2,943 (58.91%)
|
|Tyrone Krawetz838 (16.77%)
|
|Joe Chan845 (16.91%)
|
|Kristen Andrews324 (6.49%)
|
|David Tymoshchuk (CPC-M)46 (0.92%)
|
|New District
|-
| style="background:whitesmoke;"|Minto
||
|Andrew Swan3,569 (66.26%)
|
|Belinda Squance830 (15.41%)
|
|Don Woodstock602 (11.18%)
|
|Harold Dyck330 (6.13%)
|
|Cheryl-Anne Carr (CPC-M)55 (1.02%)
||
|Andrew Swan
|-
| style="background:whitesmoke;"|River Heights
|
|Dan Manning1,835 (17.76%)
|
|Marty Morantz3,384 (32.76%)
||
|Jon Gerrard4,742 (45.91%)
|
|Elizabeth May Cameron369 (3.57%)
|
|
||
|Jon Gerrard
|-
| style="background:whitesmoke;"|Wolseley
||
|Rob Altemeyer4,193 (60.68%)
|
|Harpreet Turka847 (12.26%)
|
|Eric Stewart506 (7.32%)
|
|James Beddome1,364 (19.74%)
|
|
||
|Rob Altemeyer
|}

South Winnipeg

|-
| style="background:whitesmoke;"|Fort Richmond
||
|Kerri Irvin-Ross4,026 (53.15%)
|
|Shaun McCaffrey2,908 (38.39%)
|
|Dustin Hiles369 (4.87%)
|
|Caitlin McIntyre226 (2.98%)
|
|
|
|New District
|-
| style="background:whitesmoke;"|Fort Whyte
|
|Sunny Dhaliwal2,655 (29.49%)
||
|Hugh McFadyen5,594 (62.13%)
|
|Chae Tsai710 (7.88%)
|
|
|
|
||
|Hugh McFadyen
|-
| style="background:whitesmoke;"|Riel
||
|Christine Melnick5,352 (54.69%)
|
|Rochelle Squires3,916 (40.01%)
|
|Cheryl Gilarski480 (4.90%)
|
|
|
|
||
|Christine Melnick
|-
| style="background:whitesmoke;"|Seine River
||
|Theresa Oswald5,500 (52.88%)
|
|Gord Steeves4,569 (43.93%)
|
|Troy Osiname295 (2.83%)
|
|
|
|
||
|Theresa Oswald
|-
| style="background:whitesmoke;"|Southdale
||
|Erin Selby5,662 (51.84%)
|
|Judy Eastman4,898 (44.84%)
|
|Amarjit Singh327 (2.99%)
|
|
|
|
||
|Erin Selby
|-
| style="background:whitesmoke;"|St. Norbert
||
|Dave Gaudreau3,966 (44.94%)
|
|Karen Velthuys3,935 (44.58%)
|
|Marcel Laurendeau883 (10.00%)
|
|
|
|
||
|Marilyn Brick
|-
| style="background:whitesmoke;"|St. Vital
||
|Nancy Allan5,023 (59.80%)
|
|Mike Brown2,876 (34.24%)
|
|Harry Wolbert461 (5.48%)
|
|
|
|
||
|Nancy Allan
|}

By-elections since 2011

 
|Progressive Conservative
| Jacob Nasekapow 
|align="right"| 817
|align="right"| 29.63
|align="right"| +6.18
|align="right"|

|- style="background:white;"
! style="text-align:right;" colspan="3"|Total valid votes
!align="right"|2,743
!align="right"|100.00
!align="right"|
|align="right"|
|- style="background:white;"
! style="text-align:right;" colspan="3"|Rejected and declined votes
!align="right"|14
!align="right"|
!align="right"|
|align="right"|
|- style="background:white;"
! style="text-align:right;" colspan="3"|Turnout
!align="right"|2,757
!align="right"|22.10
!align="right"|
|align="right"|
|- style="background:white;"
! style="text-align:right;" colspan="3"|Electors on the lists
!align="right"|12,475
!align="right"|
!align="right"|
|align="right"|

|}

 
|Progressive Conservative
| Doyle Piwniuk
|align="right"| 3,137
|align="right"| 68.20
|align="right"| +2.23
|align="right"|

|- style="background:white;"
! style="text-align:right;" colspan="3"|Total valid votes
!align="right"|4,600
!align="right"|100.00
!align="right"|
|align="right"|
|- style="background:white;"
! style="text-align:right;" colspan="3"|Rejected and declined votes
!align="right"|10
!align="right"|
!align="right"|
|align="right"|
|- style="background:white;"
! style="text-align:right;" colspan="3"|Turnout
!align="right"|4,610
!align="right"|33.55
!align="right"|
|align="right"|
|- style="background:white;"
! style="text-align:right;" colspan="3"|Electors on the lists
!align="right"|13,739
!align="right"|
!align="right"|
|align="right"|

|}

 
|Progressive Conservative
| Shannon Martin
|align="right"| 2,642
|align="right"| 69.99
|align="right"| -4.01
|align="right"|

| Independent
| Ray Shaw
|align="right"| 138
|align="right"| 3.66
|align="right"| -
|align="right"|

|- style="background:white;"
! style="text-align:right;" colspan="3"|Total valid votes
!align="right"|3,775
!align="right"|
!align="right"|
|align="right"|
|- style="background:white;"
! style="text-align:right;" colspan="3"|Rejected and declined votes
!align="right"|17
!align="right"|
!align="right"|
|align="right"|
|- style="background:white;"
! style="text-align:right;" colspan="3"|Turnout
!align="right"|3,792
!align="right"|27.51
!align="right"|
|align="right"|
|- style="background:white;"
! style="text-align:right;" colspan="3"|Electors on the lists
!align="right"|13,782
!align="right"|
!align="right"|
|align="right"|

|}

References

Opinion poll sources

External links
 https://web.archive.org/web/20100430144100/http://www.boundariescommission.mb.ca/default.aspx
 http://news.probe-research.com/
 http://www.electionsmanitoba.ca/en/

2011 elections in Canada
2011
2011 in Manitoba
October 2011 events in Canada